Raquel Devahl Montoya-Lewis (born April 3, 1968) is an American attorney and jurist serving as an associate justice of the Washington Supreme Court. She was nominated by Governor Jay Inslee on December 4, 2019, to fill the seat of retiring justice Mary Fairhurst.

Early life and education
Montoya-Lewis was born in Spain, where her father was stationed in the United States Air Force. Raised in New Mexico, she is a member of the Pueblo of Isleta and descended from the Pueblo of Laguna. Montoya-Lewis and her mother, who was born in Australia, are Jewish.

Montoya-Lewis earned a Bachelor of Arts degree from the University of New Mexico, a Master of Social Work degree from the University of Washington, and Juris Doctor from the University of Washington School of Law.

Career
Montoya-Lewis was a professor at Fairhaven College of Western Washington University in Bellingham, Washington. From 2008 to 2011 she was chief judge of the Lummi Nation. She also served as chief judge for the Upper Skagit Indian Tribe and the Nooksack Indian Tribe, and served as a trial and appellate judge for numerous tribes around the country. She served on the Whatcom County Superior Court from 2015 to 2020, after being appointed to that seat by Governor Inslee in December 2014; she retained her seat through two elections in 2015 and 2016 She assumed office on the Washington Supreme Court on January 6, 2020. She is the second Native American person to sit on a state supreme court and the first enrolled tribal member.

On November 3, 2020 she won election against Federal Way municipal court judge Dave Larson, 58%–41%, for a six-year-term.

See also
List of Native American jurists
List of first women lawyers and judges in Washington

References

External links
Official Washington Supreme Court biography

1968 births
Living people
21st-century American judges
21st-century Native Americans
21st-century Native American women
21st-century American women judges
Jewish American attorneys
Native American judges
Pueblo people
Justices of the Washington Supreme Court
University of New Mexico alumni
University of Washington School of Law alumni
University of Washington School of Social Work alumni
Western Washington University faculty
21st-century American Jews